The Michael Condon Memorial Award is presented annually for outstanding service by an on-ice official in the American Hockey League. The award is named after veteran linesman Mike Condon, who died suddenly during the 2001–02 season.

Winners

References

External links
Official AHL website
AHL Hall of Fame

American Hockey League trophies and awards